Bastien Canet (born 26 June 1993) is a French professional rugby league footballer who plays as a ,  or  for AS Carcassonne in the Elite One Championship.

Background
Canet was born in Val de Dagne, Aude, France.

Career
Canet came through the youth system at Val de Dagne XIII. He then began his playing career at AS Carcassonne.

International career
He was selected in France 9s squad for the 2019 Rugby League World Cup 9s.

References

External links
Toulouse Olympique profile

1993 births
Living people
AS Carcassonne players
France national rugby league team players
French rugby league players
Rugby league props
Toulouse Olympique players